Rafael de la Fuente (born November 11, 1986) is a Venezuelan actor and singer. He is known for his roles in the fantasy television series Grachi (2011–2013) and the soap opera reboot Dynasty (2017–present) as Sam "Sammy Jo" Jones. His other notable role was in the first and second seasons of the drama series Empire (2015–2016).

Early life 
Rafael Alfredo De la Fuente Torres Jr. was born in Caracas, Venezuela. on November 11, 1986. His parents are Rafael Sr., a bariatric surgeon, and Helena. He has a younger sister, Alma.

His early goal was to pursue a career as a singer. After high school, he moved to the United States to attend The University of Tampa. He graduated with a Bachelor of Arts degree in 2009. After graduation, he decided to focus on an acting career and began landing roles.

TV and Film 
His first acting job came by chance. When he was 18, a casting director visited his father's office and saw a picture of him. This led to a two episode appearance on a Venezuelan telenovela.

In 2009, he played Jorge Giraldo in the Telemundo telenovela, . In 2011, de la Fuente appeared as Max in the telenovela . This was followed by the recurring role of Diego Forlán in the Nickelodeon Latin America fantasy series, which became a main role in the second season.

In 2014 and 2015, he appeared in the films The One I Wrote For You and Lift Me Up.

In 2015 and 2016, de la Fuente appeared in the recurring role of Michael Sanchez, the boyfriend of Jamal Lyon, in the Fox musical prime time soap opera, Empire. In 2017, he appeared as Cleve Jones' boyfriend Ricardo Canto in the ABC miniseries When We Rise.

In 2017 and 2018, he appeared in the films ¡He matado a mi marido! and Antidote. He also guest starred on American Horror Story.

In March 2017, de la Fuente was cast in The CW's Dynasty reboot as Sam Jones, a gay male version of the original series' Sammy Jo Carrington (Heather Locklear).

Other Works
De La Fuente is a spokesperson for Uniquely You, a brand of ACV gummy vitamins, and the charity website Every.Org. He actively supports many charitable causes, especially those effecting the environment and the LGBTQ community.

Personal life
De La Fuente is openly gay. He was married to Australian actor Hugh Sheridan in 2009 but the marriage ended in 2018.

Filmography

References

External links 

 
 

1986 births
21st-century Venezuelan male actors
Venezuelan gay musicians
Venezuelan gay actors
Venezuelan LGBT singers
Gay singers
Living people
Male actors from Caracas
Venezuelan male telenovela actors
Venezuelan male television actors
20th-century Venezuelan LGBT people
21st-century Venezuelan LGBT people